Ron Kent (1931 – December 15, 2018), also known as Ronald E. Kent, was an American woodturner who was born in Chicago, Illinois.  He ran his own investment company in Hawaii. In 1975, his wife Myra gave him an inexpensive lathe for Christmas. Not wanting to seem unappreciative, he walked down to the beach and found a piece of driftwood. Fitting it on the lathe, he turned a form from it with a sharpened screwdriver. In 1997, Kent took an early retirement from his financial profession to concentrate exclusively on woodturning.  Ron Kent lives in Honolulu, Hawaii.

Kent is best known for his translucent bowls made of Norfolk Island pine.  His works are in the collections of the Bishop Museum (Honolulu, Hawaii), the Hawaii State Art Museum, the High Museum of Art (Atlanta, Georgia), the Honolulu Museum of Art, the Metropolitan Museum of Art (New York City), Musée des Arts Décoratifs (Paris) and the Smithsonian American Art Museum (Washington, D. C.).

Kent was the father of kimono redux artist Elizabeth Kent and novelist Steven L. Kent.

References

 Heenan, David A., Double lives, crafting your life of work and passion for untold success, Palo Alto, California, Davies-Black Pub., 2002.
 International Art Society of Hawai'i, Kuilima Kākou, Hawai’i-Japan Joint Exhibition, Honolulu, International Art Society of Hawai'i, 2004, p. 21
 Morse, Marcia and Allison Wong, 10 Years: The Contemporary Museum at First Hawaiian Center, The Contemporary Museum, Honolulu, 2006, p. 59
 Shaw, Tib, "Anniversary Profile: Ron Kent, Member #17" American Association of Woodturners, 2016, https://www.woodturner.org/page/30YearKent
 Waterbury, Ruth and David Waterbury, Conversations with Wood, Minneapolis Institute of Arts, 2011, pp. 131–137
 Wong, Allison, 10 Years - The Contemporary Museum at First Hawaiian Center - Tenth Anniversary Exhibition, The Contemporary Museum, Honolulu, Hawaii, 2006, p. 59

External links
 Ron Kent’s website

1931 births
2018 deaths
Artists from Chicago
Artists from Honolulu